The 1993 Volkswagen Cup was a women's tennis tournament played on grass courts at the Devonshire Park Lawn Tennis Club in Eastbourne in the United Kingdom that was part of Tier II of the 1993 WTA Tour. The tournament was held from 14 June until 19 June 1993. First-seeded Martina Navratilova won the singles title and earned $75,000 first-prize money.

Finals

Singles

 Martina Navratilova defeated  Miriam Oremans 2–6, 6–2, 6–3
 It was Navratilova's third singles title of the year and the 164th of her career.

Doubles

 Gigi Fernández /  Natalia Zvereva defeated  Larisa Savchenko /  Jana Novotná 2–6, 7–5, 6–1
 It was Fernandez's seventh doubles title of the year and the 39th of her career. It was Zvereva's seventh doubles title of the year and the 35th of her career.

References

External links
 ITF tournament edition details
 Tournament edition details

Volkswagen Cup
Eastbourne International
Volkswagen Cup
Volkswagen Cup
1993 in English tennis